The Cambrian Mountains (in a narrower sense: Elenydd) are a series of mountain ranges in Wales.
The term Cambrian Mountains used to apply to most of the upland of Wales. Since the 1950s, its application has become increasingly localised to the geographically homogeneous Mid Wales uplands, known in Welsh as Elenydd, which extend from Pumlumon to Radnor Forest in the east and Mynydd Mallaen to the south. This barren and sparsely populated 'wilderness' has been referred to as the Desert of Wales. The area includes the sources of the River Severn and River Wye and was unsuccessfully proposed as a national park in the 1960s and 1970s.

The wider, more historic, use of the term also includes Snowdonia in North Wales, and the Brecon Beacons and Black Mountains in South Wales.

Geology and topography

While Snowdonia contains a mix of volcanic rocks and sedimentary rocks of Cambrian and Ordovician age, the mountains of South Wales are mainly Devonian age Old Red Sandstone and Carboniferous Limestone and similarly aged sandstones. The ranges of mid-Wales on the other hand are predominantly formed from Ordovician and Silurian sandstones and mudstones which in many areas outcrop only infrequently so resulting in more rounded grassy hills. The Cambrian Mountains (in the modern sense of the term) are generally less popular with hillwalkers and scramblers than the ranges to their north and south. Since all of Wales' ranges face the predominant westerly air stream coming in from the Atlantic Ocean, they enjoy high levels of rainfall and are the source of numerous rivers, among which the rivers Severn and Wye, which rise on the eastern slopes of Pumlumon, are the largest.

Dams and wind farms
The Cambrian Mountains host the Elan Valley Reservoirs and Llyn Brianne reservoir, which provide water for the English West Midlands and for South Wales respectively. They include the Clywedog Reservoir and Nant y Moch Reservoir.  Cefn Croes, the site of a controversial wind farm project, is in the Cambrian Mountains, just south of the A44 road between Aberystwyth and Llangurig.

National park proposal
The area was proposed as a national park in 1965 by the National Parks Commission, a precursor body of the Countryside Commission. However, the proposal was opposed by many farmers and local authorities in the area. Formal consultations on the proposal began in 1970, and in 1971 the Countryside Commission proposed a revised boundary for the designation. Despite continuing local opposition, the Countryside Commission published the order designating the area on 15 August 1972, and submitted it to the Secretary of State for Wales, Peter Thomas, for confirmation.

Objections to the proposed designation were then made by all five county councils, 5 of the 7 district councils, 5 parish councils, the National Farmers Union, the Country Landowners Association, Plaid Cymru, the Campaign for the Protection of Rural Wales and others.  Support for the designation was expressed by the Ramblers Association, Youth Hostels Association, and Cyclists' Touring Club.  In July 1973, the Secretary of State announced the decision not to proceed with the designation because of "massive evidence of objections", and also rejected a call to hold a public inquiry.  This was the first time such a recommendation on national park designation had not been accepted.

Principal summits
This list confines itself to the more geographically restricted area referred to above.

Pen Pumlumon Fawr [Plynlimon] 
Pen Pumlumon Arwystli 
Pen Pumlumon Llygad-bychan 
Y Garn 
Pumlumon Fach 
Rhos Fawr 
Y Domen Ddu 
Drygarn Fawr 
Gorllwyn  
Bryn Bach  	
Pen y Garn 
Y Gamriw 
Llan Ddu Fawr 
Pegwn Mawr 
Clipyn Du 
Y Glog (Draws Drum) 
Cefn Croes

Gallery

See also
Elenydd
Desert of Wales
 The Cambrian Way high level long-distance footpath
Exercise Cambrian Patrol

References

External links
 The Cambrian Mountains Society
 The Cambrian Mountains Initiative
 Cambrian Mountains tourism guide
 Cambrian Mountains walking guide

Landforms of Powys
Landforms of Gwynedd
Landforms of Conwy County Borough
Landforms of Carmarthenshire
Landforms of Ceredigion
Landforms of Rhondda Cynon Taf
Landforms of Merthyr Tydfil County Borough
Landforms of Torfaen
Landforms of Blaenau Gwent
Mountain ranges of Wales